The Movement may refer to:

Politics 
 The Movement (Iceland), a political party in Iceland
 The Movement (Israel), a political party in Israel, led by Tzipi Livni
 Civil rights movement, the African-American political movement
 The Movement (Australia), B. A. Santamaria's Catholic Social Studies Movement
 Movement Party (France)
 The Movement (populist group), foundation of nationalist parties led by Steve Bannon

Other culture 
 The Movement (literature), the English literary group
 The Movement (theatre company), the UK theatre company
 The Movement (comics), a comic book published by DC Comics

Music 
 The Movement (production team), an American songwriting and music production duo
 The Movement (reggae band), an American rock/reggae band
 The Movement (dance band), the house music act

Albums 
 The Movement (Inspectah Deck album), 2003
 The Movement (Diggin' in the Crates Crew album), a hip-hop compilation from D.I.T.C. Records
 The Movement (Harlem World album), 1999
 The Movement (Mo Thugs album),  2003
 The Movement (Rusted Root album),  2012

Extended plays 
 The Movement (EP), by Betty Who, 2013

See also 
 Movement (disambiguation)